Adenodolichos exellii is a plant in the legume family Fabaceae, native to tropical Africa.

Description
Inflorescences are terminal, featuring purple to red flowers.

Distribution and habitat
Adenodolichos exellii is native to Angola and Zambia. Its habitat is in woodland.

References

exellii
Flora of Angola
Flora of Zambia
Plants described in 1965